Grog Run is the name of two rivers or streams in the United States:

 Grog Run (Ohio)
 Grog Run (Buffalo Creek tributary), West Virginia